Malagaciura is a genus of tephritid  or fruit flies in the family Tephritidae.

Species
Malagaciura stuckenbergi Hancock, 1991

References

Tephritinae
Tephritidae genera
Diptera of Africa